Larry Watson may refer to:
Larry Watson (footballer) (born 1957), former Australian rules football player
Larry Watson (writer) (born 1947), American author of novels, poetry and short stories